Buchanan (1881 – c.1898) was an American thoroughbred racehorse and was the winner of the 1884 Kentucky Derby, Ripple Stakes and Clark Stakes. Buchanan had not achieved a race win before competing in the Kentucky Derby and by contemporary accounts was a difficult and unruly mount. He was ridden in the 1884 derby by the great African-American jockey Isaac Burns Murphy, who won three Kentucky Derbys in his lifetime (1884, 1890, and 1891).

Buchanan retired from racing at age three and lived the remainder of his days at the Senorita Stock Farm in Lexington, Kentucky, site of the present day Kentucky Horse Park. He had limited success as a stud, siring only three stakes winners. His most successful son was the Latonia Derby winner Buck McCann.

Buchanan does not appear in the stud books after 1897 and was reported to have died at the age of 17 by a 1910 Daily Racing Form article.

The Semi-weekly Interior Journal of Stanford, KY reported on June 1, 1894 that Buchanan died after a sudden illness of inflammation of the bowels.

Pedigree

References

1881 racehorse births
Racehorses bred in Kentucky
Racehorses trained in the United States
Kentucky Derby winners
Thoroughbred family 2-c